Ponsford may refer to:

 Bill Ponsford, the Australian cricketer
 Ponsford, Minnesota, the unincorporated community in Becker County, Minnesota, United States